Kerkebet, alternatively Carcabat, is a town in Eritrea. It is located in the Anseba region and is the capital of the Kerkebet Subregion.

Wildlife such as the Grévy's zebra, Spotted hyena, ostrich, and a variety of antelopes are found here.

References
Statoids.com, retrieved December 8, 2010

Populated places in Eritrea
Anseba Region